Venetian Hills is an official neighborhood in southwest Atlanta, in the U.S. state of Georgia.  Its 2010 population was 3,790.

It is bordered:
 on the north by Cascade Avenue/Road SW, Avon Avenue SW, and the Bush Mountain neighborhood
 on the north and east by Epworth St. and the Oakland City neighborhood
 on the south and east by Fort McPherson
 on the south by Campbellton Road and the neighborhoods of Pomona Park and Campbellton Road
 on the west by Centra Villa Drive SW and the Adams Park neighborhood

Schools
In 2009, Venetian Hills Elementary School received the National Blue Ribbon of Excellence Award.

Points of Interest
Atlanta's oldest cemetery, Utoy Cemetery (1828), is located here.

References

Neighborhoods in Atlanta